was a pilot in the Imperial Japanese Navy and the founder of the Imperial Japanese Navy Air Service. Kaneko was born in Hiroshima Prefecture. He studied at Shudo Junior and Senior High School and the Imperial Japanese Naval Academy. As a naval officer he participated in the Battle of Tsushima (Naval Battle of the Sea of Japan) during the Russo-Japanese War. In 1911 Kaneko was sent to France and trained as a pilot. In 1912, at Yokosuka Naval Air Technical Arsenal, Kaneko made the first flight in Japanese naval history, piloting a Farman seaplane for 15 minutes. In 1914 Kaneko and two other naval officers flew a mission in the Siege of Tsingtao during the World War I, which was the first air attack in Japanese naval history. He was appointed the first commander and trainer of the Imperial Japanese Navy Air Service in 1916 and contributed to the development of the Service. Kaneko was promoted to major general in 1926.

References
Books

秦郁彦編『日本陸海軍総合事典』東京大学出版会

1882 births
1941 deaths
Japanese generals
Japanese military personnel of the Russo-Japanese War